Aloys Lenz (February 2, 1910 – March 1, 1976) was a German politician of the Christian Democratic Union (CDU) and former member of the German Bundestag.

Life 
Lenz was deputy district chairman of the CDU in the district of Cologne. From 1947 to 1950 he was a member of the state parliament in North Rhine-Westphalia, where he represented the constituency of Cologne-Land-South. Lenz was a member of the German Bundestag from its first election in 1949 to 1969. During this period he was always elected directly to parliament in the constituency of Cologne-Land. From 10 February 1953 to 21 January 1970 he was also a member of the European Parliament.

Literature

References

1910 births
1976 deaths
Members of the Bundestag for North Rhine-Westphalia
Members of the Bundestag 1965–1969
Members of the Bundestag 1961–1965
Members of the Bundestag 1957–1961
Members of the Bundestag 1953–1957
Members of the Bundestag 1949–1953
Members of the Bundestag for the Christian Democratic Union of Germany
Members of the Landtag of North Rhine-Westphalia
Christian Democratic Union of Germany MEPs
MEPs for Germany 1958–1979